"Ride for You" is a song by American girl group Danity Kane. It was written by Bryan Michael Cox, Kendrick "Wyldcard" Dean, and Adonis Shropshire for the group's debut album Danity Kane (2006), while production was helmed by Cox along with co-producer Wyldcard. The ballad was released as the album's second single in fall 2006. The song peaked at number 78 on the US Billboard Hot 100.

Release 

"Ride for You" was shown on a Making The Band 3 episode. It was shown that Aubrey had trouble during the recording process. It also showed Aundrea having relationship problems, which ultimately led to her breaking up with her longtime boyfriend. The week that the album was released, "Ride for You" made it onto the charts from downloads at #78. "Ride for You" was chosen at the second single through fan voting polls. The single has not had the success that their previous single "Show Stopper" had. However this could partly be due to the lack of promotion.

Music video 

The music video for "Ride for You" was directed by Marcus Raboy, and was filmed in various locations throughout Los Angeles, California on November 3, 2006. The edited video debuted on Total Request Live on December 5, 2006.

Thematically, the video deals with the four seasons. It begins with Aundrea Fimbres leaving her home in a summer vignette. After singing her verse, Fimbres enters fall and joins Aubrey O'Day for a walk through the chorus. During Dawn Richard's verse, Fimbres and O'Day leave fall behind and join Richard under an umbrella on a late fall/early winter city street.  The three of them then enter winter where they find Shannon Bex and D. Woods.  The five of them sing the chorus and enter spring right as D. Wood's verse starts.  At the end of the video, when D. Woods does her final note, the five women of Danity Kane meet up with their men and the video ends with beauty shots of each of the girls. The video peaked at #5 on TRL making it less successful than "Show Stopper" which peaked at #2.

Prior to its release, a behind the scenes segment aired video snippets of Shannon doing ballet dancing. However, the final video showed none which upset many fans.

Formats and track listings 
These are the formats and track listings of major single releases of "Ride for You."

 "Ride for You" (Album Version)
 "Ride for You" (Video)

Promo CDS

"Ride for You" (Radio Edit)
"Ride for You" (Album Version)
"Ride for You" (Instrumental)

Official Remixes 
 Album Version - 4:11
 Radio Edit - 3:58
 Instrumental - 4:11
 Lenny Ridin' Club Remix - 6:43
 Brutal Bill Mix - 7:24
 Josh Harris Club Mix - 7:07
 Sultry Remix - 4:14 (Findable on the official site of the remixer, Pull)

Chart performance

References

2006 singles
Danity Kane songs
Bad Boy Records singles
Songs written by Bryan-Michael Cox
Songs written by Adonis Shropshire
Music videos directed by Marcus Raboy
Songs written by Kendrick Dean
2006 songs